Warrior's End is a 2009 medieval epic film written and directed by Bjorn Anderson and starring Zach Maurer, John Symonds, and Paul Eenhoorn.

Premise
While on tour of the northwestern border, the prince of Midea and his companions discover invading armies from neighboring Kilea. Unable to summon reinforcements in time, the young prince must make a stand to protect his people.

Cast

 Mindy Byram as Maria
 Ricco DiStefano as General Tarkis
 Paul Eenhoorn as Kael
 Kevin Haggerty as Kole
 John Locke as King Harold
 Zach Maurer as Andreas
 Renee Pinzon as Julia
 John Symonds as Johan
 Phillip Wheeler as Will

Production
Director Bjorn Anderson decided on his 26th birthday to quit his job and pursue his dream of filmmaking. Instead of paying to go to film school, he began work on his first film, Warrior's End. The production utilized the help of the Seattle Knights for many of the expansive sword battle scenes. The cast and crew worked on a volunteer basis which allowed the film to achieve its epic look on a limited budget.

Release
The film had its premiere June 7, 2009 at Seattle's True Independent Film Festival, where it was given the Mt. Rainier Award.

References

External links 
 
 

2009 films
Films shot in Washington (state)
2000s English-language films